Enikku Njaan Swantham is a 1979 Indian Malayalam language film, directed by P. Chandrakumar and produced by M. Mani. The film stars Madhu, Jagathy Sreekumar, Jose and Shubha. The film has musical score by Shyam.

Cast
Madhu as Vasu
Jagathy Sreekumar as Kili Balan
Jose as Mohan
Shubha as Meenu
Ambika as Geetha
Nanditha Bose as Leela
KPAC Sunny as Naanu
T. P. Madhavan as Madhavankutty
Aranmula Ponnamma as Madhavakutty's mother
Meena as Vasanthy/Mohan's mother
Paravoor Bharathan as Mohan's father

Soundtrack
The music was composed by Shyam and the lyrics were written by Bichu Thirumala and Sathyan Anthikkad.

References

External links
 

1979 films
1970s Malayalam-language films
Films directed by P. Chandrakumar